Carlton Select was a British digital television channel, owned by Carlton Television. It was originally launched in June 1995 as SelecTV, by the independent production company of the same name, before being purchased by Carlton in 1997 who relaunched it as Carlton Select.

On 14 February 1997, after SelecTV was rebranded, Carlton Select branded itself as "The UK's leading entertainment cable channel". Together with quiz shows, films and comedies, the channel brought viewers a wide-ranging choice of high quality programming.

The channel was also available via satellite in Africa, on the South African DStv service.

History
Carlton Select was the result of a purchase by Pearson Television of production company, SelecTV for the value of £5.2m in 1996. SelecTV had run a cable-only channel of the same name since June 1995 and whose roots stretch as far back as the mid-80s. SelecTV was rebranded as Carlton Select on 14 February 1997.

The channel originally broadcast from 17:00 to 00:00 on weekdays with a 12:00 start at the weekend. In September 1996, Carlton Food Network launched and it timeshared with Carlton Select (still SelecTV at CFN's launch). Consequently, the channel's on-air time was 17:00 seven days a week. Later, broadcast hours were extended with closedown time on weekdays becoming 01:00, and 02:00 at the weekend.

The future of the channel was being considered internally as early as mid-1999 and Carlton Select was eventually closed down on 1 March 2000.

Programmes

A Country Practice
A Kind of Living
Airline 
Auf Wiedersehen, Pet
The Beiderbecke Trilogy
Birds of a Feather 
Blockbusters 
Blue Heelers
Blues and Twos
Boon 
Byker Grove (Also shown on Carlton Kids)
The Camomile Lawn
Chancer
Desmond's 
Duty Free
Get Smart!
The Golden Girls 
Gone to Seed
Goodnight Sweetheart
Gridlock
Hey Dad..!

Home to Roost 
I Spy
Lovejoy 
My Two Wives
Peak Practice
Perfect Scoundrels
Rising Damp 
Robin of Sherwood
The Ruth Rendell Mysteries
Sharpe 
Soldier Soldier
St. Elsewhere
Tales of the Unexpected
That's Love
Tracey Ullman: A Class Act
Tracey Ullman Takes on New York
UEFA Champions League 
Unnatural Causes
The Upper Hand 
What's Cooking?
Yesterday's Dreams

See also
Carlton Television

References

Carlton Television
Defunct television channels in the United Kingdom
Television channels and stations established in 1995
Television channels and stations disestablished in 2000